Emamzadeh-ye Hoseyn Asghar (also Romanized as Emāmzādeh-ye Ḩoseyn Āṣghar) is a village in Barzanun Rural District, Sarvelayat District, Nishapur County, Razavi Khorasan Province, Iran. At the 2006 census, its population was 15, in 7 families.

References 

Populated places in Nishapur County